7/12 may refer to:
July 12 (month-day date notation), the 193rd day of the year (194th in leap years) in the Gregorian calendar
December 7 (day-month date notation), the 341st day of the year (342nd in leap years) in the Gregorian calendar
7/12 extract, Indian extract from the land register

See also
12/7 (disambiguation)